Ramananda Centenary College, established in 1971, is the general degree college in Laulara, Purulia district. It offers undergraduate courses in arts and sciences. It is affiliated to Sidho Kanho Birsha University.

Departments

Science
Chemistry 
Physics 
Mathematics
Zoology
Botany

Arts
Bengali
English
History
Geography
Political Science
Philosophy
Economics
Santali 
Kurmali
Sociology
Education 
Sanskrit
Physical Education

Accreditation
Recently, Ramananda Centenary College has been re-accredited and awarded B grade by the National Assessment and Accreditation Council (NAAC). The college is also recognized by the University Grants Commission (UGC).

See also

References

External links
Ramananda Centenary College
Sidho Kanho Birsha University
University Grants Commission
National Assessment and Accreditation Council

Colleges affiliated to Sidho Kanho Birsha University
Educational institutions established in 1971
Academic institutions formerly affiliated with the University of Burdwan
Universities and colleges in Purulia district
1971 establishments in West Bengal